William Mostert is a South African Anglican bishop. He has been the Bishop of Christ the King since his consecration on 25 February 2017.

Notes

21st-century Anglican Church of Southern Africa bishops
Anglican bishops of Christ the King
Living people
Year of birth missing (living people)